Yamaha SZ RR Version 2.0 is a motorbike designed by the Yamaha Corporation.

History
Yamaha introduced their bike SZ RR in 2013 after that they improved it technically and relaunched it as SZ RR version 2.0. Yamaha used its new Blue Core technology in the new SZ RR version 2.0, resulting in improved mileage and  performance.

Features
The new sz rr is available in 4 colors: Matt Green, Red Dash, Ivory white, and Green arrow. Matt Green is a limited edition color that costs extra.

Motorcycles introduced in 2013
SZRR Version2